Sundsvall Municipality is a municipality in Västernorrland County, northern Sweden, where the city Sundsvall is the seat.

As most municipalities of Sweden, Sundsvalls kommun is a result of a series of amalgamations, carried out in 1952 and in the period 1965–1974. The number of original entities (existing in 1863) is thirteen.

Localities 
Localities with more than 200 inhabitants include:

Vi, Sundsvall Municipality on Alnön, 4737 (2000)
Matfors, 3239 (2006)
Johannedal, 2596 (2000)
Kvissleby, 2535 (2000)
Stockvik, 2153 (2000)
Sundsbruk, 2080 (2000)
Njurundabommen, 1959 (2006)
Skottsund, 1011 (2000)
Svartvik, 999 (2000)
Dingersjö, 946 (2000)
Ankarsvik, 830 (2000)
Essvik, 810 (2000)
Indal, 687 (2000)
Fanbyn, 603 (2000)
Stöde, 543 (2006)
Vattjom, 499 (2006)
Kovland, 449 (2000)
Lucksta, 360 (2000)
Tunadal, 360 (2000)
Klingsta och Allsta, 313 (2000)
Juniskär, 306 (2000)
Nedansjö, 289 (2000)
Liden, 280 (2000)
Gustavsberg, 225 (2000)
Hovid, 215 (2000)

Islands
Alnön
Brämön

International relations

Twin towns — Sister cities   
  Oberá, Argentina
  Pori, Finland
  Porsgrunn, Norway
  Sønderborg, Denmark
  Volkhov, Russia
  Konin, Poland

References

External links

Sundsvall – Official site

 
Sundsvall
Municipalities of Västernorrland County